The Patuxent Wildlife Research Center is a biological research center in Maryland. It is one of 17 research centers in the United States run by the U.S. Geological Survey (USGS). The center is located on the grounds of the  Patuxent Research Refuge, managed by the U.S. Fish and Wildlife Service. This is the only National Wildlife Refuge with the purpose of supporting wildlife research.

Mission 

Since its establishment in 1936 as the first wildlife experiment station in the United States, the Patuxent Wildlife Research Center has been a leading international research institute for wildlife and applied environmental research for transmitting research findings to those responsible for managing the United States' natural resources, and for providing technical assistance in implementing research findings to improve natural resource management.

Patuxent's scientists have been responsible for many important advances in natural resource conservation, especially in such areas as migratory birds, national monitoring programs for amphibians and birds, wildlife population analysis, waterfowl harvest, habitat management, wetlands, coastal zone and flood plain management, contaminants, endangered species, urban wildlife, ecosystem management and management of national parks and national wildlife refuges.

The Center develops and manages national inventory and monitoring programs and is responsible for the North American Bird Banding Program and leadership of other national bird monitoring programs. The Center's scientific and technical assistance publications, wildlife databases, and electronic media are used nationally and worldwide in managing biological resources.

The focus of the Center's mission and vision for the future is to continue its international, national and regional leadership in wildlife research. The Center will enhance its accomplishments in generating, interpreting, evaluating, and transmitting the scientific information needed to address better the pressing problems of managing the United States' biological resources, especially those under the stewardship of the Department of the Interior, as well as other Federal and non-Federal partners. Today's challenges in natural resource management involve new approaches such as adaptive management, landscape and ecosystem scale management, partnerships among multiple stakeholders, and transfer and use of the vast store of existing information using modern technology.

The Center is a Federal research facility which primarily supports programs in the Department of the Interior. The USGS Biological Resources Division, of which the Center is a part, works with others to provide the information needed to manage the United States' biological resources.

The Center also receives funds directly from agencies benefiting from its research and from other partner organizations, such as those co-located at its Laurel headquarters. Such support provides critical resources that enhance the scope and value of the Center's activities, within the mission of the Division.

Science conducted at the Center, like any scientific enterprise, ultimately, is driven by the pressing public natural resource needs coupled with the intellectual creativity and motivation of its scientists and technical staff. No research program will succeed unless it flows from the creative energies of its scientists. The research of Center scientists must be engaged at the cutting edge of scientific understanding to assure the long term success of natural resources management.

Note: much of this material was copied directly from the USGS web page on Patuxent, a public domain resource. Please edit to make more encyclopedic.

History 

farmland from the colonial period through at least World War I. Well-known landholders such as the Snowden and Duvall families owned substantial amounts of land during the colonial period and well through the 19th century. The legacy of the Snowden family can still be found in two historic homes of the area, one of which (Snowden Hall) actually stands on Patuxent Research Refuge property. In addition to these dwellings, there still exists 19 cemeteries between the center and Fort Meade whose headstones bear the inscriptions of both the Snowdens and Duvalls, in addition to lesser-known surnames such as the Woodwards, Donaldsons, and Waters families.

Almost all of the  that makes up what is now called the "North Tract" (the Patuxent River bisects the refuge into the North and Central/South Tracts) were transferred in 1991 from the Defense Department's Fort Meade landholdings. It is here that the history of Patuxent Research Refuge is most apparent to the everyday visitor. Prior to the Department of Defense's ownership of the land in 1917, many old roads that would eventually be incorporated into use for training exercises by the Army existed. Part of the DOD's Trainfire Road, now known as the Wildlife Loop, once linked the railroad town of Woodwardville with Laurel, Maryland. Long before the area became a densely wooded haven for wildlife amidst a heavily populated urban corridor, the old Duvall and Lemons Bridges transported people between Prince Georges and Anne Arundel Counties. The former still exists as a newer bridge rebuilt in the 1940s, whereas only cement posts along either side of the river offer any vestige of what was Lemon's Bridge. Perhaps the most historic old road of all, which utilized Duvall Bridge, was the old Telegraph Road. It once linked Baltimore and Washington, and today it is still possible to see century-old telegraph poles along the road in both the Central and South Tracts.

In 1946, scientists found that DDT tests were killing wildlife in tree canopies and causing significant fish kills in the Patuxent River.

In 1996, three women were murdered near the Patuxent Wildlife Research Center. One of the men involved, Dustin Higgs, was executed for the crime.

In 2017, the Patuxent Wildlife Research Center ended its 51-year effort to breed and train whooping cranes for release, due to budget cuts by the administration of President Donald Trump. The flock of 75 birds will move to the International Crane Foundation and the Calgary Zoo for continued breeding.

Fort Meade 
Fort George G. Meade, an active Army base, is near the research center. In October 1991,  were transferred from the base to the Patuxent National Research Refuge; in January 1993, another 500 were transferred, as part of Defense Appropriation Bills for 1991 and 1992, respectively.

A September 2007 environmental impact report described the expansion of Fort Meade, and particularly the proposed two additional 18-hole golf courses, as a "significant threat to the biological and territorial integrity of the Patuxent Research Refuge, a unique national interest in the forefront of scientific research and protection." In response, the Army said that it was taking steps to limit the environmental damage but that the golf courses were needed for "maintaining the quality of life for soldiers and their families." However, the historic golf course that had served as the centerpiece of Fort Meade since 1950 closed on May 1, 2012, and as of June 2022, no new golf courses were under construction.

See also
 Patuxent River State Park
 List of parks in the Baltimore–Washington metropolitan area

References

External links

USGS Patuxent Wildlife Research Center
USFWS Patuxent Research Refuge
A Youtube video of the grounds

Landmarks in Maryland
United States Geological Survey
Nature conservation organizations based in the United States
Protected areas of Prince George's County, Maryland
Biological research institutes in the United States
Protected areas established in 1936
1936 establishments in Maryland
Patuxent River
Research institutes in Maryland